The American Success Company is a 1980 American comedy-drama film directed by William Richert and starring Jeff Bridges. It was written by Larry Cohen. Re-edited versions of the film have appeared under the titles American Success, Success, The Ringer, and Good as Gold.

Premise 
Harry Flowers (Bridges) is routinely humiliated both at home and at work (the German offices of an American credit card company). Fed up, he hires prostitute Corinne (Bianca Jagger) to help him gain revenge on his quirky wife Sarah (Belinda Bauer) and her father/his boss, the overbearing Mr. Elliott (Ned Beatty) — all while enriching himself financially.

Cast

Production
The film was based on an original script by Larry Cohen. At one stage he was going to make it starring Rock Hudson and Vanessa Redgrave, but this did not eventuate. Peter Sellers wanted to star, for $100,000, but Cohen could not raise finance on Sellers' name — this was just prior to the release of the smash 1975 film The Return of the Pink Panther. Michael Caine came close to starring, but eventually Cohen sold the script.

Director Richert and stars Jeff Bridges and Belinda Bauer went to Germany and filmed The American Success Company, whose distribution rights made enough money for Richert to fund the resumption of his oft-delayed 1979 thriller Winter Kills. During production in Germany, The American Success Company was known as The Ringer.

As a result of the executive at Columbia Pictures who bought the film rights leaving the studio before its release, the film never got wide distribution. (Cohen later claimed that Richert's changes to the script ruined the film.)

Writer/director Richert re-edited, re-titled and re-released the film as American Success in 1981 and then again as Success (with a new voiceover narration) in 1983.

The film has never received official home video distribution, but has appeared in bootleg versions under the titles The Ringer  and Good as Gold.

Reception
Janet Maslin of The New York Times reviewed the 1981 re-release as a "nutty and appealing . . . curiosity. . . . [T]hough it periodically wears thin, American Success is a buoyant and enterprising movie more often than not, and what it lacks in coherence it makes up in dash." Variety wrote, "Although almost everything that happens on screen is done with considerable style and a morbid sense of humor, lack of overall point ultimately sinks the picture." In a later review, however, Time Out called the film "a delightfully offbeat satire both on capitalism and on macho posing. . . . [T]he performances are superb, and Richert manages to keep the excesses of the script nicely under control. Disarmingly un-American in tone and message, it was perhaps not surprisingly shot abroad in Germany."

References

External links

Success at Williamrichert.com
Review of film at Film Fanatic

1980 films
1980 comedy-drama films
American comedy-drama films
1980s English-language films
Films set in Munich
Films set in West Germany
Columbia Pictures films
1980 comedy films
1980 drama films
Films with screenplays by Larry Cohen
1980s American films